The 2014–15 Biathlon World Cup – World Cup 5 was held in Ruhpolding, Germany, from 14 January until 18 January 2015.

Schedule of events

Medal winners

Men

Women

Achievements
 Best performance for all time

 , 27th place in Sprint
 , 32nd place in Sprint
 , 48th place in Sprint
 , 69th place in Sprint
 , 70th place in Sprint
 , 71st place in Sprint
 , 80th place in Sprint
 , 95th place in Sprint
 , 2nd place in Mass Start
 , 1st place in Sprint
 , 10th place in Sprint
 , 11th place in Sprint
 , 24th place in Sprint
 , 25th place in Sprint
 , 31st place in Sprint
 , 33rd place in Sprint
 , 73rd place in Sprint
 , 2nd place in Mass Start

 First World Cup race

 , 46th place in Sprint
 , 59th place in Sprint
 , 32nd place in Sprint

References 

5
2015 in German sport
January 2015 sports events in Germany
2015 in Bavaria
World Cup - World Cup 5,2014-15
Sports competitions in Bavaria